Baregg is the name of a hill in northern Switzerland.

Until 1960, it remained an insignificant hill in the Swiss plains. However, with the onslaught of more vehicle traffic, Baregg became more and more of a problem. Eventually, the Baregg Tunnel was built.

Mountains of Aargau
Mountains of Switzerland
Mountains of Switzerland under 1000 metres